The 2021 FIBA Women's European Championship for Small Countries was the 16th edition of this competition. The tournament took place in Nicosia, Cyprus, from 20 to 25 July 2021. Luxembourg women's national basketball team won the tournament for the second time.

Participating teams

Group phase
In this round, the teams were drawn into two groups of three. The first two teams from each group advance to the semifinals, the last teams will play the 5th place playoff.

Group A

Group B

Playoffs

Semifinals

5th place match

3rd place match

Final

Final standings

References

FIBA Women's European Championship for Small Countries
Small Countries
International basketball competitions hosted by Cyprus
2021 in Cypriot sport
FIBA Women's European Championship for Small Countries